Nass or NASS may refer to:

Places
Nass River, in northern British Columbia
Nass Camp settlement in British  Columbia
Ngee Ann Secondary School, a secondary school in Tampines, Singapore

Peoples and cultures
 Nass, the Nisga'a language
 People of the Nass, the Nisga'a people of northern British Columbia

Organizations
 nass.gov.ng, the website of the National Assembly (Nigeria)
 National Agricultural Statistics Service (or NASS), part of the U.S. Department of Agriculture
 National Association of Secretaries of State (or NASS), an association of United States Secretaries of State
 National Association of Stable Staff (or NASS), in the UK
 National Asylum Support Service (or NASS), in the UK
 North American Spine Society (or NASS), which publishes The Spine Journal
 North American Sundial Society (or NASS)

Other uses
Nass (Islam), an Arabic word meaning "a known, or clear, legal injunction"
Nass Corporation, a Bahraini industrial and construction services conglomerate
 Ninjas & Superspies (or NASS), a role-playing game

See also
 Naas, a town in eastern Ireland
 NaSSA (Noradrenergic and specific serotonergic antidepressant)

Language and nationality disambiguation pages